The Play-offs of the 1993 Federation Cup Europe/Africa Zone were the final stages of the Zonal Competition involving teams from Europe and Africa. Those that qualified for this stage placed first and second in their respective pools.

The ten teams were then randomly paired up to compete in five play-off ties, with the winners qualifying for the World Group.

Croatia vs. Russia

Belgium vs. Slovenia

Great Britain vs. Turkey

Latvia vs. Hungary

Israel vs. Ireland

Belgium was also defeated in the first round, by Latvia, 2–1. Latvia was subsequently defeated in the second round by Netherlands, 3–0.

See also
Fed Cup structure

References

External links
 Fed Cup website

1993 Federation Cup Europe/Africa Zone